Ermanno Olmi (24 July 1931 – 7 May 2018) was an Italian film director and screenwriter.

Biography
Olmi was born to a Catholic family in Bergamo, in the Lombardy region in northern Italy.
 When Olmi was three years old, his family moved to Milan, where he attended a scientific high school and took acting classes at the Academy of Dramatic Arts. He became interested in filmmaking while he was working at the Milanese electrical company Edisonvolta, where he began by producing 16mm documentaries about power plants. 

In 1963 he married Loredana Detto, who had played Antonietta Masetti in his film Il Posto (1961). Another early film was I fidanzati (1963).

Perhaps his best known film is The Tree of Wooden Clogs (L'Albero degli zoccoli), which was awarded the Palme d'Or at the 1978 Cannes Film Festival. The film drew heavily on Olmi's grandmother's stories about peasant life in agricultural regions of Italy. In 1983 his film Walking, Walking was screened out of competition at Cannes. In 1988, his La leggenda del santo bevitore (The Legend of the Holy Drinker), based on the novella by Joseph Roth and starring Rutger Hauer, won the Golden Lion at the Venice Film Festival as well as a David di Donatello award.

His The Profession of Arms (Il mestiere delle armi) also won a David di Donatello award.

In 2008 he received the Honorary Golden Lion at the Venice Film Festival.

Olmi died on 7 May 2018 in Asiago, after a long battle with Guillain-Barre syndrome.

Directing techniques
Olmi's films have been described as "humanistic and reflective, portraying everyday people in particular landscapes and locations, while at the same time being charged with social comment and poetic flashes."

His films fit into the artistic mold of Italian neorealism, though Olmi argued, in an interview found on the Criterion Edition DVD of his 1961 film, Il Posto, that this was the artistic tradition he was responding against because he used non-actors in authentic locations whereas neorealism, he claimed, used professional actors. However, many neorealist directors also used non-professional actors for secondary and sometimes even primary roles.

His films, like most of those considered to be products of the neorealist movement, are shot in long, slow takes, and generally contain some sort of social commentary, though rarely do the neorealists wear their political opinions on their sleeves.

Awards
1978: Palme d'Or for The Tree of Wooden Clogs
1988: Golden Lion for The Legend of the Holy Drinker
2004: Leopard of Honour
2008: Honorary Golden Lion

David di Donatello
1962: Best Director for Il Posto
1989: Best Director for The Legend of the Holy Drinker
2002: Best Director for The Profession of Arms

Nastro d'Argento
1979: Best Director for The Tree of Wooden Clogs
1989: Best Director for The Legend of the Holy Drinker

Filmography
Time Stood Still (1959)
Il Posto (1961)
The Fiances (1963)
A Man Named John (1965)
One Fine Day (1968)
The Circumstance (1973)
The Tree of Wooden Clogs (1978)
Walking, Walking (1983)
Long Live the Lady! (1987)
The Legend of the Holy Drinker (1988)
The Secret of the Old Woods (1993)
Genesis: The Creation and the Flood (1994)
The Profession of Arms (2001)
Singing Behind Screens (2003)
One Hundred Nails (2007)
The Cardboard Village (2011)
Greenery Will Bloom Again (2014)

Retrospectives
In February 2016, the Cinémathèque suisse honored Olmi with a retrospective at the cinema "Le Capitole" in Lausanne.

From January 10 to February 28, 2019, the Austrian Film Museum conducted a complete retrospective of Olmi's work (excluding only his short films) - together with the films of Federico Fellini - in collaboration with the Cineteca Nazionale and the "Istituto Italiano di Cultura di Vienna". 

Also in 2019, Film at Lincoln Center honored Olmi with a two-week retrospective, from June 14 to 26. The series was co-produced by Istituto Luce Cinecittà and presented in association with the Ministry of Culture of Italy. The films then traveled to Cleveland, where the Cleveland Institute of Art Cinematheque hosted a seven-part retrospective, from July 6 to August 17, 2019.

References

External links

1931 births
2018 deaths
David di Donatello winners
Directors of Palme d'Or winners
Directors of Golden Lion winners
Italian film directors
Italian Roman Catholics
Italian-language film directors
Nastro d'Argento winners
Ciak d'oro winners
Film people from Bergamo